Magnetospirillum is a Gram-negative, microaerophilic genus of magnetotactic bacteria, first isolated from pond water by the microbiologist R. P. Blakemore in 1975. They have a spiral (helical) shape and are propelled by a polar flagellum at each end of their cells.  Four species have been described: M. magnetotacticum strain MS-1 (originally classified as Aquaspirillum magnetotacticum; M. magneticum strain AMB-1; M. gryphiswaldense and M. bellicus.

Habitat
The typical habitat of Magnetospirillum species consists of shallow fresh water and sediments, characterized by low concentrations of oxygen for growth (microaerophilic) where they live in the upper portion of the sediment (oxic/anoxic interface) and prefer an oxygen gradient of around 1–3%.

Magnetotaxis
Probably the most peculiar characteristic of Magnetospirillum species is their capacity to orient themselves according to Earth's magnetic field, magnetotaxis. This is achieved through the presence of special organelles called magnetosomes in the bacterium's cytoplasm. Magnetospirillum species also resort to aerotaxis, to remain in favorable O2 concentration conditions. When the bacteria ingest iron, proteins inside their cells interact with it to produce tiny crystals of the mineral magnetite, the most magnetic mineral on Earth.

Purification of magnetosomes is accomplished by use of a magnetic separation column after disruption of the cell membrane.  If a detergent is used on purified magnetosomes, they tend to agglomerate rather than staying in chain form. Due to the high quality of the single-domain magnetic crystals, a commercial interest has developed in the bacteria. The crystals are thought to have the potential to produce magnetic tapes and magnetic target drugs.

Species
 Magnetospirillum bellicus
 Magnetospirillum caucaseum
 Magnetospirillum gryphiswaldense
 Magnetospirillum magnetotacticum—isolated from microaerobic zones of freshwater sediments. Differing from other chemoheterotrophs; the bacterium produces higher amounts of chelator in response to high iron concentrations. 
 Magnetospirillum marisnigri
 Magnetospirillum moscoviense

References

Rhodospirillales
Magnetoreception
Bacteria genera